Lisa Karolina Ohlin (born 20 February 1960 in New York City) is a Swedish screenwriter and director.

Biography 
Ohlin pursued film studies at the New York University Graduate Film School. During the studies, she worked in various functions in Swedish films. Between 2006 and 2009, she worked as a feature film consultant at the Swedish Film Institute.

She is the daughter of economist Göran Ohlin and Ruth Ohlin, stepdaughter to Anita Lagercrantz-Ohlin and granddaughter of Holger Ohlin.

Filmography

References

External links 

Lisa Ohlin at Libris

1960 births
Swedish screenwriters
Swedish film directors
Sommar (radio program) hosts
Swedish women radio presenters
Living people
Writers from New York City
Swedish women film directors
Swedish women screenwriters
Tisch School of the Arts alumni